The Middle Tennessee Anime Convention (MTAC) is an annual three day anime convention held during April at the Sheraton Music City in Nashville, Tennessee.

Programming 
The convention typically features an AMV contest, artists alley, charity auction, cosplay contest, dealers room, gaming (arcade, board, card, console, tabletop), Japanese Fashion Shows, Lolita Tea Party, a ramen eating contest, rave, and panels. Table Top and Video Gaming runs 24 hours a day during the convention.

History
Tommy Yune was unable to attend the convention in 2010 due to the funeral of Carl Macek. MTAC delayed closing the 2010 convention due to the 2010 Tennessee floods for the members who could not leave. The convention in 2012 shared the Nashville Convention Center with the Full Moon Tattoo and Horror Festival. Due to attendance growth, the convention expanded into additional space in the convention center and hotel in 2013. The dealer's room in 2016 experienced long lines. MTAC 2020 was postponed due to the COVID-19 pandemic, and later rescheduled to 2021. MTAC 2021 was cancelled due to the COVID-19 pandemic.

Event history

Notes

References

External links 

MTAC Website

Anime conventions in the United States
Events in Nashville, Tennessee
Annual events in Tennessee
Conventions in Tennessee
Recurring events established in 1999
1999 establishments in Tennessee
Tourist attractions in Nashville, Tennessee